Keep On Rockin' may refer to:

 Keep On Rockin' (film), a film of a 1969 Little Richard concert
 ''Keep On Rockin''' (Confederate Railroad album), 1998
 ''Keep On Rockin''' (Brian Cadd album), 1976
 ''Keep On Rockin''' (Slade II album), 1994